Neufrankenroda is a district of the rural community of Hörsel in the district of Gotha in Thuringia, Germany.

Location 
Neufrankenroda lies on a long, flat hill, (390 m above sea level) that separates the valley of the Hörsel from the lower lying valley of the Nesse. It is about 7 Kilometers north-west of the town of Gotha.

History 
The rual area and farmland may have been inhabited since pre-historic times. It was first mentioned in a document in 1104. Its name is reminiscent of the Franks, who lived there in the Early Middle Ages.. Ownership of the farmlands often changed hands during the Middle Ages. In 1677, Duke Friedrich I of Gotha bought the place from the lords of Erffa and built a country estate. By the late 18th century, the area of Neufrankenroda was formed as a colony to help poor farmers and foresters live a more productive life.

After the Second World War, Neufrankenroda first became state property of the Soviet Zone of Occupation. It later became state property of the German Democratic Republic (DDR). During this time, the place gained some notoriety for its fruit growing and various horticultural breeding attempts. The so-called "Black Rose" was bred in Neufrankenroda and sold as an export good to various European countries. In the 1960s, several paved concrete roads were built connecting the Russian military bases near Gotha and the training area of the Kindel military airfield

Christian community 
Even during the DDR Regime, the German Protestant Church was already interested in the isolated location in order to build a Christian-style residential complex. Since the German Reunification, the Neufrankenroda settlement has been the center of the evangelical family community SILOAH.

In summer of 2014 The Royal Rangers, a German christian scouting organization, had their Bundescamp set up on the grounds of Neufrankenroda. About 14,000 scouts built up large tents and a temporary stadium to host the festivities.

External links 

Municipalities in Thuringia